Jawairiah binti Noordin (born 8 October 1990) is an inactive Malaysian tennis player.

On 16 November 2009, she reached her best singles ranking of world No. 931.

Jawairiah made her WTA Tour debut at the 2010 Malaysian Open, having received a wild card with Huỳnh Phương Đài Trang into the doubles tournament, but they lost to Vitalia Diatchenko and Chanelle Scheepers in the first round.

She also received a wildcard into the main draw of the 2015 Malaysian Open, where she lost to Yulia Putintseva in the first round.

Playing for Malaysia Fed Cup team, Jawairiah has a win–loss record of 17-14.

She has won two bronze medals for Malaysia at the Southeast Asian Games, in 2007 and 2009 in the women's team event.

ITF finals

Singles (0–1)

Doubles (2–1)

Fed Cup participation

Singles

Doubles

References

External links
 
 
 

1990 births
Living people
People from Penang
Malaysian people of Malay descent
Malaysian Muslims
Malaysian female tennis players
Sportspeople from Penang
Southeast Asian Games bronze medalists for Malaysia
Southeast Asian Games medalists in tennis
Competitors at the 2007 Southeast Asian Games
Competitors at the 2009 Southeast Asian Games
Competitors at the 2015 Southeast Asian Games
Competitors at the 2021 Southeast Asian Games